Rafaelia is a genus of flesh flies (insects in the family Sarcophagidae). There are about nine described extant species in Rafaelia.

Species
These nine species belong to the genus Rafaelia:

R. acanthoptera (Wulp, 1895) c g
R. ampulla (Aldrich, 1916) c g
R. aurigena (Lopes, 1969) c g
R. natiuscula (Lopes, 1941) c g
R. pelenguensis Lopes, 1988 c g
R. rufiventris Townsend, 1917 i c g b
R. sissyra Dodge, 1967 i c g
R. texana (Aldrich, 1916) c g
R. vernilis (Reinhard, 1947) c g
Data sources: i = ITIS, c = Catalogue of Life, g = GBIF, b = Bugguide.net

References

Further reading

 

Sarcophagidae
Articles created by Qbugbot
Oestroidea genera